Ackermann is a surname. "Acker" comes from German or Old English, meaning "field", and is related to the word "acre". Ackermann means "farmer" (literally: "fieldman"). Notable people with the surname, also spelled Akkermann. include:

 Annely Akkermann (born 1972) Estonian politician
 Anton Ackermann (1905–1973), German foreign minister
 Barbara Ackermann (1925–2020), American politician
 Christian Ackermann (died 1710), Estonian sculptor
 Colin Ackermann (born 1991), South African cricketer
 Dorothea Ackermann (1752–1821), German actress
 Else Ackermann (1933–2019), German physician and pharmacologist
 Ernst Christian Wilhelm Ackermann (1761–1835), Bohemian public servant
 Franz Ackermann (born 1963), German abstract artist
 Georg Ackermann (disambiguation)
 Gustav Adolph Ackermann (1791–1872), a German lawyer
 Haider Ackermann (born 1971), French fashion designer
 Hans Ackermann (16th century), German dramatist
 Hans-Wofgang Ackermann (1936-2017), German virologist and microbiologist
 Henri Ackermann (1922–2014), Luxembourgian racing cyclist
 Jacob Fidelis Ackermann (1765–1815), a German doctor
 Jens Ackermann (born 1975), German politician
 Jessie Ackermann (1857–1951), social reformer, feminist, writer, traveller
 Johan Ackermann (born 1970), South African rugby union player
 Johan Christian Ackermann (1740–1795), Swedish landscape gardener
 Johann Adam Ackermann (1780–1853), German landscape painter
 Johann Christian Gottlieb Ackermann (1756–1801), a German doctor
 Josef Ackermann (disambiguation), several people with this name, including:
Josef Ackermann (born 1948), a Swiss banker and former chief executive officer of Deutsche Bank
 Karl Gustav Ackermann (1820-1901), German politician
 Kathrin Ackermann (born 1938), German actress
 Kirk von Ackermann (died 2003), American contractor and murder victim
 Klaus Ackermann (born 1946), German footballer
 Konrad Ernst Ackermann (1710–1771), German actor
 Leopold Ackermann (Petrus Fouresius, 1771–1831), a biblical archaeologist
 Liliane Ackermann (1938–2007), French scientist and author
 Louise-Victorine Ackermann (1813–1890), French poet
 Lourens Ackermann (born 1934), South African judge
 Manfred Ackermann (1898–1991), Austrian politician and trade union official
 Marie Magdalene Charlotte Ackermann (1757–1775), German actress
 Max Ackermann (1887–1975), German artist
 Oliver Ackermann, American musician
 Otto Ackermann (disambiguation)
 Pascal Ackermann, German cyclist
 Rita Ackermann (born 1968), Hungarian-American artist
 Ronny Ackermann (born 1977), German skier
 Rosemarie Ackermann (born 1952), German high jumper
 Rudolph Ackermann (1764–1834), German-born English publisher, printer, and inventor
 Silke Ackermann, German museum curator, and historian of science
 Sophie Charlotte Ackermann (1714–1792), German actress
 Stefan Ackermann, German singer
 Stephan Ackermann (born 1963), German bishop
 Stephanus Ackermann (born 1985), Namibian cricketer
 Theodor Ackermann (1825–1896), German pathologist
 Theo Akkermann (1907–1982), German sculptor
 Uwe Ackermann (born 1960), East German hurdler
 Wilhelm Ackermann (1896–1962), German mathematician
 Wilhelm Heinrich Ackermann (1789–1848), German teacher

See also 
 Ackermann (disambiguation)
 Ackerman (surname)
 Akkerman (surname)
 Akerman
 Åkerman
 Ackermans (disambiguation)

References 

German-language surnames